Ahangaran may refer to several places in Iran:
Ahangaran, Ilam
Ahangaran, Kerman
Ahangaran, Gilan-e Gharb, Kermanshah Province
Ahangaran, Ravansar, Kermanshah Province
Ahangaran, Sahneh, Kermanshah Province
Ahangaran, Khuzestan
Ahangaran, Kurdistan
Ahangaran, Lorestan
Ahangaran, Markazi
Ahangaran, Nishapur, Razavi Khorasan Province
Ahangaran, Rashtkhvar, Razavi Khorasan Province
Ahangaran-e Olya, Lorestan Province
Ahangaran-e Sofla, Lorestan Province